Nelson F.C. is an English semi-professional association football club based in the town of Nelson, Lancashire. The club was founded in 1881 and initially played in the Lancashire Combination. In 1921, Nelson became a professional outfit when they were one of the teams selected to play in the inaugural season of the newly formed Football League Third Division North. The team played in the Football League for the following 10 years, enjoying a season in the Second Division in 1923–24. Nelson were relegated from the Football League in 1931, failing re-election after finishing bottom of the league. Defender Clement Rigg amassed the most league appearances for Nelson during this period with 254. The highest goalscorer was Joe Eddleston who netted on 97 occasions for the club before transferring to Swindon Town in 1926.

This list includes all the players who made at least one league appearance for Nelson during this professional period. Appearances and goals are counted together for players who had more than one spell with the club during this time.

Players

References

Players
Nelson
Association football player non-biographical articles
List